JSC CROC incorporated is an technology company operating in the Russian IT market. CROC was established by Boris Bobrovnikov in 1992. The company provides systems integration and managed B2B services, off-the-shelf products and promising end-to-end technologies, such as Big data, blockchain, artificial intelligence, Internet of things, RPA, and machine learning, while also offering cloud and data center services based on its own data centers. It is headquartered in Moscow.

History 
Founded in 1992 in Moscow, CROC first supplied computers, peripherals, and network equipment and provided relevant maintenance services.

In 1995, CROC focused on systems integration as its core business and then, in 1996—1998, expanded its portfolio with computing and structured cabling systems, networks, enterprise telephony, and storage systems. In 2000—2001, the company increased the number of its regional Compaq authorized service centers. Also, in 2001, the CROC North-West branch was opened in St. Petersburg, and later, in 2004, another CROC Ural branch was launched in Yekaterinburg.

Thus, CROC has been one of the largest national IT service providers since the early 2000s.

In 2005, CROC proceeded with the creation and support of data storage and processing systems.

Addressing the economic recession of 2008—2009 the company completed more virtualization projects, container data center implementations and relocations, as well as outsourcing engagements, while CROC was also developing expertise in the deployment of video conferencing and AV systems. In early 2009, CROC’s Moscow offices moved to a single headquarters located at Volochaevskaya Street.

In 2010, the company launched Russia's first domestic cloud platform.

The first renewable energy projects were completed in 2011. The next year, CROC innovative force started to implement virtual reality (VR) projects.

In 2016, CROC Disk was launched, a secure and handy corporate file exchange service. CROC installed security, TV broadcasting, telecom, and multimedia systems, as well as solutions for automation and dispatch control of engineering systems, at Krasnodar FC Stadium.

In 2017, the company started selling managed and cloud services.

In 2017—2018, CROC kicked off its digital transformation journey and the adoption of new technology solutions that change product development approaches and create business growth opportunities in various market domains.

In response to the COVID-19 pandemic, the company switched to remote work in the spring of 2020. During the pandemic, the fastest growth occurred in the computing infrastructure, digital processes, and unified telecommunications business lines.

Primary lines of business 
 Systems integration
 Infrastructure solutions
 Cybersecurity
 ERP implementation
 Big Data
 Machine Learning
 Robotic Process Automation (RPA)
 Public Cloud (CROC Cloud Services)
 Own data centers
 Managed services.

References 

Technology companies established in 1992
Companies based in Moscow
Systems engineering
Russian companies established in 1992